Islamabad is the capital city of Pakistan. It is the country's ninth-most populous city, with a population of over 1.2 million people, and is federally administered by the Pakistani government as part of the Islamabad Capital Territory. Built as a planned city in the 1960s, it replaced Rawalpindi as Pakistan's national capital. The city is notable for its high standards of living, safety, cleanliness, and abundant greenery.

Greek architect Constantinos Apostolou Doxiadis developed Islamabad's master plan, in which he divided it into eight zones; administrative, diplomatic enclave, residential areas, educational and industrial sectors, commercial areas, as well as rural and green areas administered by the Islamabad Metropolitan Corporation with support from the Capital Development Authority. Islamabad is known for the presence of several parks and forests, including the Margalla Hills National Park and the Shakarparian. It is home to several landmarks, including the country's flagship Faisal Mosque, which is the world's fifth-largest mosque. Other prominent landmarks include the Pakistan Monument and Democracy Square.

Rated as Gamma + by the Globalization and World Cities Research Network, Islamabad has the highest cost of living in Pakistan. The city's populace is dominated by both middle and upper-middle class citizens.

Islamabad is home to twenty universities, including Bahria University, Quaid-e-Azam University, PIEAS, COMSATS University, and NUST. It is also rated as one of the safest cities in Pakistan, and has an expansive RFID-enabled surveillance system with almost 2000 active CCTV cameras.

Toponymy 
The name Islamabad means City of Islam. It is derived from two words: Islam and abad. Islam refers to the religion of Islam, Pakistan's state religion, and -abad is a Persian suffix meaning cultivated place, indicating an inhabited place or city. According to a history book by Muhammad Ismail Zabeeh, a school teacher from Arifwala known as Qazi Abdur Rehman Amritsari proposed the name of the city.

Occasionally in writing, Islamabad is colloquially abbreviated ISB. Such usage originated in SMS language, in part due to the IATA location identifier for the Islamabad International Airport.

History

Early history
Islamabad Capital Territory, located on the Pothohar Plateau of the northern Punjab region, is considered one of the earliest sites of human settlement in Asia. Some of the earliest Stone Age artefacts in the world have been found on the plateau, dating from 100,000 to 500,000 years ago. Rudimentary stones recovered from the terraces of the Soan River testify to the endeavours of early man in the inter-glacial period. Items of pottery and utensils dating back to prehistory have been found.

Excavations by Dr. Abdul Ghafoor Lone reveal evidence of a prehistoric culture in the area. Relics and human skulls have been found dating back to 5000 BCE that indicate the region was home to Neolithic peoples who settled on the banks of the Swaan River, and who later developed small communities in the region around 3000 BCE.

The Indus Valley civilization flourished in the region between the 23rd and 18th centuries BCE. Later the area was an early settlement of the Aryan community which migrated into the region from Central Asia. Many great armies such as those of Zahiruddin Babur, Genghis Khan, Timur and Ahmad Shah Durrani crossed the region during their invasions of the Indian subcontinent. In 2015–16, the Federal Department of Archaeology and Museums, with the financial support of National Fund for Cultural Heritage, carried out initial archaeological excavations in which unearthed the remains of a Buddhist stupa at Ban Faqiran, near the Shah Allah Ditta caves, which was dated to the 2nd to the 5th century CE.

Construction and development

When Pakistan gained independence in 1947, the southern port city of Karachi was its provisional national capital. In 1958, a commission was constituted to select a suitable site near Rawalpindi for the national capital with particular emphasis on location, climate, logistics, and defence requirements, along with other attributes. After extensive study, research, and a thorough review of potential sites, the commission recommended the area northeast of Rawalpindi in 1959. In the 1960s, Islamabad was constructed as a forward capital for several reasons. Karachi was also located at the southern end of the country, and exposed to attacks from the Arabian Sea. Pakistan needed a capital that was easily accessible from all parts of the country. Karachi, a business centre, was also considered unsuitable partly because of intervention of business interests in government affairs. The newly selected location of Islamabad was closer to the army headquarters in Rawalpindi and the disputed territory of Kashmir in the north.

Greek firm of architects, led by Konstantinos Apostolos Doxiadis, designed the master plan of the city based on a grid plan which was triangular in shape with its apex towards the Margalla Hills. The capital was not moved directly from Karachi to Islamabad; it was first shifted temporarily to Rawalpindi in the early 60s, and then to Islamabad when essential development work was completed in 1966. In 1981, Islamabad separated from Punjab province to form Capital Territory. Such world-renowned architects as  Edward Durell Stone and Gio Ponti have been associated with the city's development.

Recent history

Islamabad has attracted people from all over Pakistan, making it one of the most cosmopolitan and urbanised cities of Pakistan. As the capital city it has hosted a number of important meetings, such as the South Asian Association for Regional Cooperation summit in 2004.

In October 2005, the city suffered damage due to the 2005 Kashmir earthquake which had a magnitude of 7.6. Islamabad has experienced a series of terrorist incidents including the July 2007 Siege of Lal Masjid (Red Mosque), the June 2008 Danish embassy bombing, and the September 2008 Marriott bombing. In 2011, four terrorism incidents occurred in the city, killing four people, including the murder of the Punjab Governor Salmaan Taseer.

Construction of the Rawalpindi-Islamabad Metrobus, the region's first mass transit line, began in February 2014 and was completed in March 2015. The Rawalpindi Development Authority built the project at a cost of approximately Rs 24 billion, which was shared by both the Federal government and the provincial government of Punjab.

Geography

The modern capital and the ancient Gakhar city of Rawalpindi form a conurbation, and are commonly referred to as the Twin Cities.

To the northeast of the city lies the colonial era hill station of Murree, and to the north lies the Haripur District of Khyber Pakhtunkhwa. Kahuta lies on the southeast, Taxila, Wah Cantt, and Attock District to the northwest, Gujar Khan, Rawat, and Mandrah on the southeast, and the metropolis of Rawalpindi to the south and southwest.

A further  area is known as the Specified Area, with the Margala Hills in the north and northeast. The southern portion of the city is an undulating plain. It is drained by the Kurang River, on which the Rawal Dam is located.

Climate

Islamabad has a humid subtropical climate (Köppen: Cwa), with five seasons: Winter (November–February), Spring (March and April), Summer (May and June), Rainy Monsoon (July and August) and Autumn (September and October). The hottest month is June, where average highs routinely exceed . The wettest month is July, with heavy rainfalls and evening thunderstorms with the possibility of cloudburst and flooding. The coolest month is January.

Islamabad's micro-climate is regulated by three artificial reservoirs: Rawal, Simli, and Khanpur Dam. Winters generally feature dense fog in the mornings and sunny afternoons. In the city, temperatures stay mild, with snowfall over the higher-elevation points on nearby hill stations, notably Murree and Nathia Gali. Light snowfall sometimes happens on the peaks of the hills visible from the city, though this is rare. Snowfall does not occur in the city itself. On 23 July 2001, Islamabad received a record-breaking  of rainfall in just 10 hours. It was the heaviest rainfall in Islamabad in the past 100 years and the highest rainfall in 24 hours as well.

Cityscape

Civic administration

The Islamabad Capital Territory (ICT) Administration, generally known as ICT Administration or Islamabad Administration, is the civil administration as well as main law and order agency of the Federal Capital.

The local government authority of the city is the Islamabad Metropolitan Corporation (IMC) with some help from Capital Development Authority (CDA), which oversees the planning, development, construction, and administration of the city. Islamabad Capital Territory is divided into eight zones: Administrative Zone, Commercial District, Educational Sector, Industrial Sector, Diplomatic Enclave, Residential Areas, Rural Areas and Green Area. Islamabad city is divided into five major zones: Zone I, Zone II, Zone III, Zone IV, and Zone V. Out of these, Zone IV is the largest in area. Zone I consists mainly of all the developed residential sectors while Zone II consists of the under-developed residential sectors. Each residential sector is identified by a letter of the alphabet and a number, and covers an area of approximately 2 km × 2 km ( mi ×  mi). The sectors are lettered from A to I, and each sector is divided into four numbered sub-sectors.

Sectors

Series A, B, and C are still underdeveloped. The D series has seven sectors (D-11 to D-17), of which only sector D-12 is completely developed. This series is located at the foot of Margalla Hills. The E Sectors are named from E-7 to E-17. Many foreigners and diplomatic personnel are housed in these sectors. In the revised Master Plan of the city, CDA has decided to develop a park on the pattern of Fatima Jinnah Park in sector E-14. Sectors E-8 and E-9 contain the campuses of Bahria University, Air University, and the National Defence University. The F and G series contains the most developed sectors. F series contains sectors F-5 to F-17; some sectors are still under-developed. F-5 is an important sector for the software industry in Islamabad, as the two software technology parks are located here. The entire F-9 sector is covered with Fatima Jinnah Park. The Centaurus complex is a major landmark of the F-8 sector. G sectors are numbered G-5 through G-17. Some important places include the Jinnah Convention Centre and Serena Hotel in G-5, the Red Mosque in G-6, the Pakistan Institute of Medical Sciences, the largest medical complex in the capital, located in G-8, and the Karachi Company shopping center in G-9.

The H sectors are numbered H-8 through H-17. The H sectors are mostly dedicated to educational and health institutions. National University of Sciences and Technology covers a major portion of sector H-12. The I sectors are numbered from I-8 to I-18. With the exception of I-8, which is a well-developed residential area, these sectors are primarily part of the industrial zone. Two sub-sectors of I-9 and one sub-sector of I-10 are used as industrial areas. CDA is planning to set up Islamabad Railway Station in Sector I-18 and Industrial City in sector I-17. Zone III consists primarily of the Margalla Hills and Margalla Hills National Park. Rawal Lake is in this zone. Zone IV and V consist of Islamabad Park, and rural areas of the city. The Soan River flows into the city through Zone V.

Islamabad–Rawalpindi metropolitan area 

When the master plan for Islamabad was drawn up in 1960, Islamabad and Rawalpindi, along with the adjoining areas, was to be integrated to form a large metropolitan area called Islamabad/Rawalpindi Metropolitan Area. The area would consist of the developing Islamabad, the old colonial cantonment city of Rawalpindi, and Margalla Hills National Park, including surrounding rural areas. However, Islamabad city is part of the Islamabad Capital Territory, while Rawalpindi is part of Rawalpindi District, which is part of province of Punjab.

Initially, it was proposed that the three areas would be connected by four major highways: Murree Highway, Islamabad Highway, Soan Highway, and Capital Highway. However, to date only two highways have been constructed: Kashmir Highway (the former Murree Highway) and Islamabad Highway. Plans of constructing Margalla Avenue are also underway. Islamabad is the hub all the governmental activities while Rawalpindi is the centre of all industrial, commercial, and military activities. The two cities are considered sister cities and are highly interdependent.

Architecture

Islamabad's architecture is a combination of modernity and old Islamic and regional traditions. The Saudi-Pak Tower is an example of the integration of modern architecture with traditional styles. The beige-coloured edifice is trimmed with blue tile works in Islamic tradition, and is one of Islamabad's tallest buildings. Other examples of intertwined Islamic and modern architecture include Pakistan Monument and Faisal Mosque. Other notable structures are: Secretariat Complex designed by Gio Ponti, Prime Minister's secretariat based on Mughal architecture and the National Assembly by Edward Durell Stone.

The murals on the inside of the large petals of Pakistan Monument are based on Islamic architecture. The Shah Faisal Mosque is a fusion of contemporary architecture with a more traditional large triangular prayer hall and four minarets, designed by Vedat Dalokay, a Turkish architect and built with the help of funding provided by King Faisal of Saudi Arabia. The architecture of Faisal Mosque is unusual as it lacks a dome structure. It is a combination of Arabic, Turkish, and Mughal architectural traditions. The Centaurus is an example of modern architecture under construction in Islamabad. The seven star hotel was designed by WS Atkins PLC.The newly built Islamabad Stock Exchange Towers is another example of modern architecture in the city.

Demographics

Language 

According to 2017 census, the mother tongue of the majority of the population is Punjabi at 52% (a decrease of 18% from the 1998 census), and a major dialect is Pothohari, 19% of the population are Pashto speakers, while an additional 12% speak Urdu, the national language, whereas the rest 17% speak other languages. Similarly according to 1998 census, the total migrant population of the city is 1 million, with the majority (691,977) coming from Punjab. Around 210,614 of the migrated population came from Sindh and rest from Khyber Pakhtunkhwa and Azad Kashmir. Smaller populations emigrated from Balochistan, and Gilgit–Baltistan.

Literacy
The majority of the population lies in the age group of 15–64 years, around 59.38%. Only 2.73% of the population is above 65 years of age; 37.90% is below the age of 15. Islamabad has the highest literacy rate in Pakistan, at 88%. 9.8% of the population has done intermediate education (equivalent to grades 11 and 12). 10.26% have a bachelor or equivalent degree while 5.2% have a master or equivalent degree. The labour force of Islamabad is 185,213 and the unemployment rate is 15.70%.

Religion

Islam is the largest religion in the city, with 95.43% of the population following it. Christianity is the second largest religion is with 4.34% of the population following it. The Christians are concentrated mainly in the urban areas. Hinduism is followed by 0.04% of the population according to the 2017 census.

Economy

Islamabad is a net contributor to the Pakistani economy, as whilst having only 0.8% of the country's population, it contributes 1% to the country's GDP. Islamabad Stock Exchange, founded in 1989, is Pakistan's third largest stock exchange after Karachi Stock Exchange and Lahore Stock Exchange, and was merged to form Pakistan Stock Exchange. The exchange had 118 members with 104 corporate bodies and 18 individual members. The average daily turnover of the stock exchange is over 1 million shares.

According to the World Bank's Doing Business Report of 2010, Islamabad was ranked as the best place to start a business in Pakistan. Islamabad's businesses are Pakistan's most compliant for paying tax dues. , Islamabad LTU (Large Tax Unit) was responsible for Rs 371 billion in tax revenue, which amounts to 20% of all the revenue collected by Federal Board of Revenue.

Islamabad has seen an expansion in information and communications technology with the addition two Software Technology Parks, which house numerous national and foreign technological and information technology companies. Some jobs have relocated from India to Islamabad. Awami Markaz IT Park houses 36 IT companies, while Evacuee Trust house 29 companies. Islamabad will see its third IT Park by 2020, which will be built with assistance from South Korea.

Culture

Islamabad is home to many migrants from other regions of Pakistan and has a cultural and religious diversity of considerable antiquity. Due to its location on the Pothohar Plateau, remnants of ancient cultures and civilisations such as Aryan, Soanian, and Indus Valley civilisation can still be found in the region. A 15th-century Gakhar fort, Pharwala Fort is located near Islamabad. Rawat Fort in the region was built by the Gakhars in 16th century and contains the grave of the Gakhar chief, Sultan Sarang Khan.

Saidpur village is supposedly named after Said Khan, the son of Sarang Khan. The 500-year-old village was converted into a place of Hindu worship by a Mughal commander, Raja Man Singh. He constructed a number of small ponds: Rama kunda, Sita kunda, Lakshaman kunda, and Hanuman kunda. The region is home to a small Hindu temple that is preserved, showing the presence of Hindu people in the region. The shrine of Sufi mystic Pir Meher Ali Shah is located at Golra Sharif, which has a rich cultural heritage of the pre-Islamic period. Archaeological remains of the Buddhist era can also still be found in the region. The shrine of Bari Imam was built by Mughal Emperor Aurangzeb. Thousands of devotees from across Pakistan attend the annual Urs of Bari Imam. The event is one of the largest religious gatherings in Islamabad. In 2004, the Urs was attended by more than 1.2 million people.

The Lok Virsa Museum in Islamabad preserves a wide variety of expressions of folk and traditional cultural legacy of Pakistan. It is located near the Shakarparian hills and boasts a large display of embroidered costumes, jewellery, musical instruments, woodwork, utensils and folkloristic objects from the region and other parts of Pakistan.

Tourism

 
Faisal Mosque is an important cultural landmark of the city and that attracts many tourists daily. Faisal Mosque built in 1986, was named after the Saudi Arabian King, Faisal bin Abdul Aziz. It also serves the purpose of accommodating 24,000 Muslims that pray at this mosque. Faisal Mosque that is designed by the Turks and financed by the Kingdom of Saudi Arabia includes calligraphy of Quranic verses along the walls of the mosque.

One of the landmarks for tourists is the Pakistan Monument built in 2007 located in Islamabad. This tourist attraction represents the patriotism and sovereignty of Pakistan. The design is shaped as a dome with petal-shaped walls that are engraved with arts portraying Pakistan's other tourist landmarks such as the Badshahi Mosque, Minar-e-Pakistan and Lahore Fort.

Islamabad holds some of Pakistan's most prestigious museums such as Lok Virsa Museum, Institute of Folk and Traditional Heritage Shakarparian Park and prominent galleries such as the National Art Gallery and Gallery 6.

The Islamabad Museum contains many relics and artifacts dating back to the Gandhara period of the region, an intriguing fusion of Buddhist and Graeco-Roman styles. The living culture of Islamabad and Pakistan is best explored at Lok Virsa Museum, as well as the Institute of Folk and Traditional Heritage in Shakarparian Park.

Islamabad is built upon civilization and architecture that ranges from the 10th Century to the modern era. As Islamabad is situated on the Potohar Plateau, the remains of civilization descending from stone-age era include the Acheulian and the Soanian traditions and these are tourist landmarks. Islamabad has an array of historic landmarks that reflect the Hindu civilization that dates back to the 16th Century with examples such as Saidpur. Saidpur that is situated in Islamabad has progressed from a village to a sacred place that includes temples where the Hindu Mughal Commanders worshipped.

Margalla Hills National Park is located in the North sector of Islamabad and is in close proximity to the Himalayas. The National Park includes of picturesque valleys and scenic hills that include various wildlife such as Himalayan goral, Barking deer and leopards. Flanked by wildlife and vegetation, Margalla Hills National Park also includes accommodation and camping grounds for tourists.

Education

Islamabad boasts the highest literacy rate in Pakistan at 98%, and has some of the most advanced educational institutes in the country. A large number of public and private sector educational institutes are present here. The higher education institutes in the capital are either federally chartered or administered by private organisations and almost all of them are recognised by the Higher Education Commission of Pakistan. High schools and colleges are either affiliated with the Federal Board of Intermediate and Secondary Education or with the UK universities education boards, O/A Levels, or IGCSE. According to Academy of Educational Planning and Management's report, in 2009 there were a total of 913 recognised institutions in Islamabad (31 pre-primary, 2 religious, 367 primary, 162 middle, 250 high, 75 higher secondary and intermediate colleges, and 26 degree colleges). There are seven teacher training institutes in Islamabad with a total enrolment of 604,633 students and 499 faculty.

The Gender Parity Index in Islamabad is 0.93 compared to the 0.95 national average. There are 178 boys only institutes, 175 girls only, and 551 mixed institutes in Islamabad. Total enrolment of students in all categories is 267,992; 138,272 for boys and 129,720 for girls. There are 16 recognised universities in Islamabad with a total enrolment of 372,974 students and 30,144 teachers. Most of the top ranked universities; National University of Sciences and Technology, COMSATS Institute of Information Technology and Pakistan Institute of Engineering & Applied Sciences, also have their headquarters in the capital. The world's second largest general university by enrolment, Allama Iqbal Open University is located in Islamabad for distance education. Other universities include Air University, Bahria University, Center for Advanced Studies in Engineering, Federal Urdu University of Arts, Science and Technology, Hamdard University, National University of Computer and Emerging Sciences, Capital University of Science & Technology, National Defence University, Shifa Tameer-e-Millat University, National University of Modern Languages, Iqra University, International Islamic University, Virtual University of Pakistan, Muhammad Ali Jinnah University, The University of Lahore, Abasyn University, and The Millennium University College.

Healthcare

Islamabad has the lowest rate of infant mortality in the country at 38 deaths per thousand compared to the national average of 78 deaths per thousand. Islamabad has both public and private medical centres. The largest hospital in Islamabad is Pakistan Institute of Medical Sciences (PIMS) hospital. It was established in 1985 as a teaching and doctor training institute. PIMS functions as a National Reference Center and provides specialised diagnostic and curative services. The hospital has 30 major medical departments. PIMS is divided into five administrative branches. Islamabad Hospital is the major component with a 592-bed facility and 22 medical and surgical specialties.

The Children's Hospital is a 230-bed hospital completed in 1985. It contains six major facilities: Surgical and Allied Specialties, Medical and Allied Specialties, Diagnostic Facilities, Operation Theatre, Critical Care (NICU, PICU, Isolation & Accident Emergency), and a Blood Bank. The Maternal and Child Health Care Center is a training institute with an attached hospital of 125 beds offering different clinical and operational services. PIMS consists of five academic institutes: Quaid-e-Azam Postgraduate Medical College, College of Nursing, College of Medical Technology, School of Nursing, and Mother and Child Health Center.

PAEC General Hospital and teaching institute, established in 2006, is affiliated with the Pakistan Atomic Energy Commission. The hospital consists of a 100-bed facility and 10 major departments: Obstetrics and Gynecology, Pediatric, General Medicine, General Surgery, Intensive Care Unit/Coronary Care Unit, Orthopedics, Ophthalmology, Pathology, Radiology, and Dental Department. Shifa International Hospital is a teaching hospital in Islamabad that was founded in 1987 and became a public company in 1989. The hospital has 70 qualified consultants in almost all specialties, 150 IPD beds and OPD facilities in 35 different specialisations. According to the Federal Bureau of Statistics of the Government of Pakistan, in 2008 there were 12 hospitals, 76 dispensaries, and five maternity and child welfare centers in the city with a total of 5,158 beds.

Transport

Aerial transport
Islamabad is connected to major destinations around the world and domestically through Islamabad International Airport (IIAP). The airport is the largest in Pakistan and is located south-west of Islamabad. The new airport inaugurated on 20 April 2018, spread over 19 square kilometers with 15 passenger boarding bridges, including facilities to accommodate two double-decker Airbus A380s, the world's largest airplane, 15 remote bays and 3 remote bays for Air cargo.

Public transport

The Rawalpindi-Islamabad Metrobus is a  bus rapid transit system operating in the Islamabad-Rawalpindi metropolitan area. The Metrobus network's first phase was opened on 4 June 2015, and stretches 22.5 kilometres between Pak Secretariat, in Islamabad, and Saddar in Rawalpindi. The second stage stretches 25.6 kilometres between the Peshawar Morr Interchange and New Islamabad International Airport and was inaugurated on 18th April 2022. On 7 July 2022, the Green Line and Blue Lines were added to this Metrobus network. The system uses e-ticketing and an Intelligent Transportation System and is managed by the Punjab Mass Transit Authority. This service is very reliable and consistent, and the labour force as well as students are using this government provided service on a daily basis. It has reduced the time consumption by reducing the route. Now this bus service is being extended to more areas in Islamabad that include areas near G-13 and H-12. Work is being done to keep it along the Kashmir Highway.

The city is served by Pakistan Railways at Islamabad railway station.

Private transport
People use private transport like Taxis, Careem, Uber, Bykea, and SWVL for local journeys. In March 2016, Careem became functional in Islamabad and Rawalpindi with taxi services.

Roadways 

Islamabad is linked to Rawalpindi through the Faizabad Interchange, which has a daily traffic volume of about 48,000 vehicles.

Sports

Islamabad has a multipurpose sports complex opposite Aabpara. It includes Liaquat Gymnasium for indoor games, Mushaf Squash Complex and Jinnah Sports Stadium for outdoor games, which is a venue for regular national and international events. 2004 SAF Games were held in the stadium. Some other sports venues of Islamabad include Diamond Club Ground, Shalimar Cricket Ground and Islamabad Golf Club.

There is another multipurpose sports complex in the F6 Markaz. It has tennis courts, a basketball court with fibre-glass boards and a Futsal ground which introduced artificial turf to the people of Islamabad.

Major sports in the city include cricket, football, squash, hockey, table tennis, rugby and boxing. The city is home to Islamabad United, which won the first ever Pakistan Super League in 2016 and second title in 2018, and Islamabad All Stars, which participates in the Super Kabaddi League.

Islamabad also has various rock climbing spots in the Margalla Hills.

The Pakistan Sports Complex has three swimming pools for children. These facilities attract a large gathering on weekends.

In Pakistan Super League, the capital is represented by Islamabad United team that is owned by Leonine Global Investments through its sports entity Leonine Global Sports, owned by Amna Naqvi and Ali Naqvi.

Recreation

Faisal Mosque 
Located in Islamabad, Pakistan, the Faisal Mosque is the largest mosque in South Asia and the fourth largest mosque in the world. Built in the year 1986, it was named after the late king of Saudi Arabia, Faisal Bin Abdul Aziz, who backed and financed the construction.

Trail 3 

The most famous and oldest hiking track of Islamabad is Trail 3. It starts from the Margalla Road in sector F-6/3. Due to steep hills, the trail is exhausting to some extent. The course leads to the point where it goes up to the Viewpoint and is about a 30 – 50 minutes track. After the Viewpoint it continues for another easy-going 45 – 60 minutes and reaches the Pir Sohawa, where there are two restaurants for food, The Monal and La Montana. In total, it is approximately a one-hour and thirty minute walk.

Pakistan Monument 

Located in Islamabad, the Pakistan National Monument is a representation of the four provinces and three territories of the nation. Designed by the famous architect, Arif Masood, this blooming flower shaped structure reflects the progress and prosperity of Pakistan.

Shah Allah Ditta Caves 
Shah Allah Ditta village is a centuries old village and a Union Council of Islamabad Capital Authority. The village is named after a dervish that belonged to the Mughal era. It is estimated to be 650 years old approximately. It is also home to ancient caves that reflects the previous civilizations. The 2500-year-old Buddhist caves at the foot of Margalla Hills are located in west of Taxila, east of Islamabad and in the central area of Khanpur. A spring, a pond and a garden still exist near the Shah Allah Ditta Caves. There are some banyan trees in the garden, while all other fruit trees are gone. The water from the same spring was used to irrigate the garden adjoining the caves. During the Mughal period, when India was the centre of Sufism originating from Arabia and Central Asia, a saint named Shah Allah Ditta stayed in this garden and was entombed here. The place formerly attributed to sadhus, monks, or jogis is today known for the famous Sufi Shah Allah Ditta. A short distance from these caves is also an ancient baoli (stepwell) in the village of Kanthila, which is said to have been built by Sher Shah Suri.

Notable people

Twin towns and sister cities

  Abu Dhabi, United Arab Emirates
  Amman, Jordan
  Ankara, Turkey
  Beijing, China
  Jakarta, Indonesia 1984, restarted in 2010
 Madrid, Spain
  Minsk, Belarus
  Seoul, South Korea
 Astana, Kazakhstan

See also

 Birds of Islamabad

References

External links

 
 
 Metropolitan Corporation Islamabad
 
 

 
Capitals of Pakistan
Capitals in Asia
01
Metropolitan areas of Pakistan
1960s establishments in Pakistan
Planned capitals
Planned cities in Pakistan
Union councils of Islamabad Capital Territory
Populated places established in the 1960s